Curaçá is the northernmost city in the Brazilian state of Bahia.

The municipality was designated a priority area for conservation and sustainable use when the Caatinga Ecological Corridor was created in 2006.

References 

Municipalities in Bahia
Populated places established in 1832
1832 establishments in Brazil